The Romance of a Gaucho (Spanish:El Romance de un gaucho) is a 1961 Argentine drama film directed by Rubén W. Cavallotti and starring Walter Vidarte, Lydia Lamaison and Julia Sandoval. It is based on the 1930 novel of the same title by Benito Lynch. The film's sets were designed by Saulo Benavente.

Cast
  Walter Vidarte
  Lydia Lamaison
  Julia Sandoval
  Rolando Chaves
  Guillermo Battaglia
  Juan Carlos Lamas
  Mario Casado
  Margarita Corona
  Silvia Nolasco
  Mirtha Miller
  Mariano Vidal Molina

External links
 

1961 films
1961 Western (genre) films
Argentine Western (genre) films
1960s Spanish-language films
Argentine black-and-white films
Films directed by Rubén W. Cavallotti
Films based on Argentine novels
Films set in Argentina
1961 drama films
Films about gauchos
1960s Argentine films